The following towns, villages, and other populated places are located within Gujrat District, Punjab, Pakistan. Where known, they are listed by tehsil; otherwise they are in alphabetical order.

A 

 Achh
 Addowal
 Ajnala
 Alamgarh
 Amra Kalan
 Awan Sharif
 Azam Nagar

B 

 Bagrianwala
 Baharwal
 Bajarwala
 Balobanian
 Bangial, Gujrat
 Bareela
 Barila Sharif
 Barnali
 Baroo
 Basrian
 Bator, Gujrat
 Beharaj
 Behilpur
 Behlolpur
 Beowali
 Bhaddar
 Bhago
 Bhagowal Kalan
 Bhagowal Khurd
 Bhakoki
 Bhalot Shera
 Bhand Gran
 Bharaj
 Bhota
 Bhurch
 Bido Bhatti
 Butter

C 

 Chachian
 Chachian ranian
 Chak Bakhtawar
 Chak Bhola
 Chak Budho
 Chak Jani
 Chak Manju
 Chakdina
 Chakfazal
 Chakori Bhalowal
 Chakori Khurd
 Chakori Sher Ghazi
 Chakrian
 Chechian
 Chhimber
 Chhokar Kalan
 Chiryawala Shareef
 Choa Rajgan
 Chopala

D 

 Deona
 Dera Alampur Gondlan
 Dhakkar
 Dhall Kakka
 Dhama
 Dhool Khurd
 Dhoria
 Dhunni
 Dinga
 Dittewal
 Dlawarpur
 Doga Sharif

F-I 

 Fateh Bhand
 Fatehpur
 Gakhar Chanan
 Gegian
 Geowanjal
 Ghuman
 Gilli Wala
 Gochh
 Goteriala
 Gujrat
 Guliana
 Gunja, Pakistan
 Hafiz Hayat
 Haji Chak
 Haji Muhammad
 Hajiwala
 Hakla
 Hardaspur
 Hassam, Rasulpur
 Hayatgarh
 Ikhlasgarh
 Islam Garh
 Ismaila Shareef

J-L 

 Jagal
 Jalalpur Jattan
 Jand Sharif
 Jataria Khurd
 Jaura, Pakistan
 Jhamat Noabad
 Jhantla
 Kakrali
 Kala Chak
 Kala Kamala
 Kalra Khasa
 Kan Mohla
 Kante pind
 Karianwala
 Karnana, Pakistan
 Khambi, Pakistan
 Kharana Pir Ghazi
 Kharian
 Kharian Cantonment
 Kheewa
 Khohar
 Khokhar
 Khori Alam
 Kot Ameer Hussain
 Kot Rahim Shah
 Kotha Gujjran
 Kotla Sarang Khan
 Kotli Kohala
 Kulachor
 Kunjah
 Kurree
 Lakhanwal
 Lalamusa
 Langay
 Langrial

M-N 

 Machiwaal
 Malka, Pakistan
 Malikpur, Gujrat
 Malowal
 Mandeer
 Mangowal Gharbi
 Mangowal Sharqi
 Marala
 Mari Khokhran
 Mari Waraichan
 Maroof
 Mehmand Chak
 Miana Chak
 Mirza Tahir, Punjab
 Mohla Khurd
 Mohri Sharif
 Moinuddinpur
 Mola Langrial
 Mumazpur
 Mund, Gujrat
 Nafrian
 Nandwal
 Naseera
 Noonanwali

P-R 

 Panjan Kissana
 Peroshah
 Pir Ghazi
 Pir Jand
 Punjwarian
 Qiladar
 Ranewal
 Rasool Pur

S-T 

 Saadat Pur
 Sahan Kalan
 Samrala Sharif
 Sarai Alamgir
 Sarai Alamgir Tehsil
 Saroki
 Sarsal
 Sehna
 Shadiwal
 Shahbazpur
 Shahjahanian
 Shahni Kotli
 Sheikh Pur
 Sidh, Gujrat
 Sikaryali
 Sook Kalan
 Sook Khurd
 Sri alamgir
 Sullah
 Tanda
 Thatta Musa
 Thikrian
 Thimka
 Thutha Rai Bahadar
 Trerwanwala
 Wadapind

Kharian Tehsil 
Villages in Kharian Tehsil include:

 Basrian
 Ghurko
 Ladian
 Manglia
 Roulia
 Sadwal Kalan
 Sullah